Queen Elizabeth School is a coeducational, comprehensive secondary school and sixth form with academy status. It is located in Kirkby Lonsdale, in the English county of Cumbria.

In 1591, Queen Elizabeth School (QES) was granted a royal charter and founded as a free grammar school.  QES moved from its original Mill Brow location in 1840 to the newly constructed Springfield House on Biggins Lane, Kirkby Lonsdale. Girls were first admitted in 1905, and by 1930 there were 88 day pupils and 54 boarders, approximately half and half boys and girls. QES became a non-selective comprehensive school in 1978 and continued to take in boarders until the late 1980s.

In 1997 Springfield House, the boys' boarding accommodation, was redeveloped as a dedicated Sixth Form area.  On 1 December 2010 QES became the first school in the county to convert to academy status. However, the school continues to coordinate with Cumbria County Council for admissions. QES offers GCSEs and BTECs as programmes of study for pupils, while students in the sixth form have the option to study from a range of A-levels and further BTECs.

Notable former pupils
Thomas Burrow, Indologist and former Boden Professor of Sanskrit at the University of Oxford
Lawrence Hargrave,  aeronautical engineer and explorer
Kate Ford, Coronation Street actress
Adam Kaye & George Townsend, duo from Bondax
Fiona Crackles, England Hockey player
James Knox, Professional cyclist for Deceuninck–Quick-Step
Stirrat Johnson-Marshall, British architect

References

External links
Queen Elizabeth School - QES

Secondary schools in Cumbria
Educational institutions established in the 1590s
1591 establishments in England
Academies in Cumbria
Kirkby Lonsdale